Christian Joe Conteh (born 27 August 1999) is a German professional footballer who plays as a midfielder for Dynamo Dresden, on loan from the Dutch club Feyenoord.

Career
Conteh made his professional debut for FC St. Pauli in the 2. Bundesliga on 29 July 2019, scoring a goal in the away match against Arminia Bielefeld.

In July 2020, Conteh joined Eredivisie club Feyenoord. On 18 August 2021, it was announced that Conteh would be playing on loan for SV Sandhausen for the 2021–22 season. In January 2022, Feyenoord announced that Conteh's loan at SV Sandhausen had been terminated early and that he would instead play the rest of the 2021–22 season at FC Dordrecht

On 2 July 2022, Conteh moved on a new loan to Dynamo Dresden.

Personal life
Conteh was born in Hamburg to parents who emigrated from Ghana, growing up in the borough Wandsbek. His older brother Sirlord Conteh is also a professional footballer.

References

External links
 
 

1999 births
Living people
Footballers from Hamburg
German footballers
Ghanaian footballers
German sportspeople of Ghanaian descent
Association football midfielders
FC St. Pauli II players
FC St. Pauli players
Feyenoord players
SV Sandhausen players
FC Dordrecht players
Dynamo Dresden players
2. Bundesliga players
Regionalliga players
Eredivisie players
German expatriate footballers
Expatriate footballers in the Netherlands
German expatriate sportspeople in the Netherlands